Kurupi is a genus of abelisaurid theropod dinosaur from the Late Cretaceous Marília Formation of Brazil. The type and only species is Kurupi itaata. It is so named because its remains were found near a love hotel.

Etymology 
The generic name is named for Kurupi, a god of fertility and sex from Guaraní mythology. According to the authors, "The choice of the name is due to the fact that the fossils were found in the region of “Motel Paraíso” (“Paradise Motel”), a place intended for intimate encounters." The specific name is derived from the Tupi language and has two roots: ita, meaning hard, and atã, meaning rock. This name is in reference to the cemented rocks of the Monte Alto region. Together, the generic and specific name can be translated as rock-hard Kurupi, or rock-hard god of sex.

Description 
The holotype, MPMA 27-0001/02, consists of three caudal vertebrae and a partial pelvic girdle. It would have been a cursorial, stiff-tailed hunter.

Classification 
The describers assign Kurupi to the Abelisauridae, but its precise relationships are uncertain because a phylogenetic analysis only generates a massive polytomy of abelisaurids more derived than Spectrovenator.

References 

Abelisaurids
Maastrichtian life
Late Cretaceous dinosaurs of South America
Cretaceous Brazil
Fossil taxa described in 2021